Palo Grande is a corregimiento in Alanje District, Chiriquí Province, Panama. Its population as of 1990 was 563; its population as of 2000 was 563.

References

Corregimientos of Chiriquí Province